Renato Martini (born 12 November 1949) is an Italian former long-distance runner. He competed in the marathon at the 1972 Summer Olympics.

References

External links
 

1949 births
Living people
Athletes (track and field) at the 1972 Summer Olympics
Italian male cross country runners
Italian male long-distance runners
Italian male marathon runners
Olympic athletes of Italy
People from Tortona
Sportspeople from the Province of Alessandria